The Wind Cave National Park Administrative and Utility Area Historic District comprises the central portion of Wind Cave National Park in South Dakota. The district centers on the historic entrance to Wind Cave, which is surrounded by park administrative and interpretive structures, most of which were built by the Civilian Conservation Corps in the 1930s.

History 
The historic entrance to Wind Cave, discovered in 1881, was modified to allow better access to the natural entrance by blasting. A new passage was created, also by blasting, to allow visitor access. between 1892 and 1894, with another entrance blasted in 1936 by the CCC. The same year, a visitor center was built a short distance away overlooking the stream valley behind. Auxiliary buildings include the 1905 Superintendent's Cottage, the 1934 Superintendent's Residence, several employee residences, a ranger dormitory and mess hall, and other structures, mostly dating to the 1930s. The planned landscape blends with its environment, using a modified version of the National Park Service Rustic style.

The district was listed on the National Register of Historic Places on July 11, 1984.

References

External links
NPS.gov—Wind Cave National Park: The Wind Cave Historic District 

National Register of Historic Places in Wind Cave National Park
National Park Service buildings and structures
Historic districts on the National Register of Historic Places in South Dakota
Buildings and structures in Custer County, South Dakota
Government buildings on the National Register of Historic Places in South Dakota
Civilian Conservation Corps in South Dakota
Historic American Buildings Survey in South Dakota
Historic American Engineering Record in South Dakota
National Park Service Rustic architecture